Lee Bryant (born August 31, 1945) is an American actress. She played a hysterical passenger in the 1980 film Airplane!, reprising the role in the 1982 sequel. She also appeared as Sam Waterston's wife in the 1977 conspiracy thriller Capricorn One, and as Jennifer Westfeldt's mother in the romantic comedy Friends with Kids (2011).

Bryant was born in Manhattan, New York. She has guest starred in a number of television series including T. J. Hooker, Marcus Welby, M.D., Charlie's Angels, Kojak, Three's Company, Starsky & Hutch, Lou Grant, The Incredible Hulk, St. Elsewhere, Moonlighting, Alien Nation, and other series.

Filmography

References

External links

1945 births
Living people
20th-century American actresses
21st-century American actresses
Actresses from New York City
American film actresses
American television actresses
People from Manhattan